Leung Wing Kwong (born 8 July 1966) is a Hong Kong sprinter. He competed in the men's 100 metres at the 1988 Summer Olympics.

References

External links
 

1966 births
Living people
Athletes (track and field) at the 1988 Summer Olympics
Hong Kong male sprinters
Olympic athletes of Hong Kong
Commonwealth Games competitors for Hong Kong
Athletes (track and field) at the 1990 Commonwealth Games
Place of birth missing (living people)